Thermotomaculum hydrothermale is a species of Acidobacteriota.

References

Bacteria
Bacteria described in 2017